USS Cordova (CVE-39) (originally AVG-39 then later ACV-39) was an escort carrier launched 27 December 1942 by Seattle-Tacoma Shipbuilding of Tacoma, Washington; sponsored by Mrs. A. E. Mitchell.  Reclassified CVE-39 on 15 July 1943, Cordova was transferred to the Royal Navy on 25 August 1943, as HMS Khedive (D62)  Khedive served as the command ship for the South of France invasion in August 1944. From April to August 1945 was with the East Indies Fleet as part of the 21st Aircraft Carrier Squadron.  Khedive was to take part in the invasion of Singapore in September 1945, codenamed Operation Tiderace. But with the Japanese surrender, she was merely deployed to the island for security.

She was returned to United States custody on 26 January 1946 and sold into merchant service 23 January 1947 as Rempang (later Daphne).  She was sold for scrap in Spain in 1975.

Design and description
These ships were all larger and had a greater aircraft capacity than all the preceding American built escort carriers. They were also all laid down as escort carriers and not converted merchant ships.

Armament comprised: two 4"/50, 5"/38 or 5"/51 Dual Purpose guns in single mounts, sixteen 40 mm Bofors anti-aircraft guns in twin mounts and twenty 20 mm Oerlikon anti-aircraft cannons in single mounts. They had a maximum aircraft capacity of twenty-four aircraft which could be a mixture of Hellcat, Vought F4U Corsair or Hawker Sea Hurricane fighter aircraft and or Grumman Avenger anti-submarine aircraft.

Notes

References
 

 

Ruler-class escort carriers
Ships built in Tacoma, Washington
1943 ships